Matthew Jehu Samuels (born October 12, 1986), known professionally as Boi-1da (a play on "boy wonder"), is a Jamaican-Canadian record producer and songwriter based in Toronto, Ontario.

The Toronto raised producer has worked with a variety of artists and groups, most notably Drake, Rihanna, Eminem, Jay-Z, Nicki Minaj, Nas, Lana Del Rey, Kanye West and Kendrick Lamar among others. In 2015, Samuels served as the executive producer for Drake's mixtape If You're Reading This It's Too Late.

Early life
Born in Kingston, Jamaica, Samuels moved to Canada when he was three and grew up in the North York and Scarborough districts of Toronto. He was also raised in Ajax, Ontario, where he attended Pickering High School. His father was a keen listener of dancehall music and so Samuels was brought up listening to Jamaican music. At the age of eight, his mother bought him a Casio keyboard, and at the age of 15, a friend had introduced him to FL Studio (formerly Fruity Loops). Without any formal musical training, he started using the FL Studio beat-making program. A few years later, he won three consecutive Battle of the Beatmakers championships; because of this accomplishment, he was given a spot in the Battle of the Beatmakers judging panel.

His first production work was at the age of 18, when he worked on two tracks on a mixtape (Room for Improvement)  for Drake.

Career
Dr. Dre appeared on the remix of "Set It Off" by Kardinal Offishall, produced by Boi-1da. In an interview with FLOW 93.5, Boi-1da revealed that he was working on beats for Dr. Dre's highly anticipated album, Detox, which was to be released in 2011. However, that album was indefinitely shelved, and none of the released or leaked tracks by Dr. Dre featured Boi-1da's production. He has since stated that he was working with songwriter Sean Garrett and has submitted tracks for Usher. He also worked on Busta Rhymes' Extinction Level Event 2: The Wrath of God.

In 2010, Boi-1da produced the hit song "Not Afraid" by Eminem, and "hahahaha jk?" from Das Racist's second mixtape Sit Down, Man.

Boi-1da assisted with Drake's second album, Take Care, which was released November 15, 2011.

In March 2013, he produced "5AM in Toronto" by Drake, which was later released in Drake's 2019 compilation album, "Care Package".

Boi-1da worked with rapper Lecrae on his song "Gimme a Second" from his mixtape Church Clothes. He also collaborated with rapper Bizzle on his 2013 album The Good Fight3. He is also a member of Drake's October's Very Own with Noah "40" Shebib and T-Minus.

Boi-1da produced "Party Favors" for Tinashe for her album Nightride. The single features Young Thug.

In January 2016, Rihanna released the dancehall track "Work", featuring Drake. The song peaked at number one on the Billboard Hot 100, becoming the second Boi-1da produced track to top the charts. Between 2016 and 2017, Boi-1da continued to produce dancehall tracks, such as Drake's "Controlla", Tyga's "1 of 1", PartyNextDoor's "Only U" and Nicki Minaj's "Regret in Your Tears".

He co-produced the 2016 Kanye West single "Real Friends".

In September 2017, he produced "No Limit" by G-Eazy featuring A$AP Rocky and Cardi B.

In January 2018, he produced "God's Plan" by Drake. In May 2018, he produced "TATI" by 6ix9ine featuring DJ Spinking. In August 2018, he produced "Lucky You" by Eminem featuring Joyner Lucas.

In March 2019, he produced "I'm Single" by Jake Paul, and "Maze" and "Make Believe" from Juice Wrld's album, "Death Race for Love". In May 2019, he produced "Isis" by Joyner Lucas featuring Logic. In June 2019, he produced "No Guidance" by Chris Brown featuring Drake. In July 2019, he produced "1000 Nights" by Ed Sheeran featuring Meek Mill and A Boogie wit da Hoodie.

In October 2020, he produced "Tyler Herro" by Jack Harlow.

Musical style

Boi-1da is known for his distinctive dancehall sound, having been brought up listening to dancehall before hip-hop. He often incorporates live instrumentation and an air horn sound effect into his beats, as used in dancehall and reggae, and frequently incorporates samples in his productions. Boi-1da has spoken out against songs which imitate dancehall, criticising fellow Toronto musician Tory Lanez for doing so in his 2016 single "Luv".

He currently uses FL Studio 12 to make beats, previously, he used Fruity Loops 3.56, 7 XL and 9.

Boi-1da has spoken about being influenced by producers such as Dr. Dre, Swizz Beatz, Timbaland, and The Neptunes.

Production discography

Awards and nominations

ASCAP Pop Music Awards
The American Society of Composers, Authors and Publishers (ASCAP) hosts a series of awards shows, honouring people in different music categories; pop music is one of its seven categories. In 2011, Drake presented the award to him and 40. They both won the ASCAP Pop Music Award for the Songwriters of the Year for "Over".

Grammy Awards
The Grammy Awards are awarded annually by the National Academy of Recording Arts and Sciences. Boi-1da has one win out of nineteen nominations.

|-
|2010
|"Best I Ever Had" (Drake)
|rowspan="2"|Best Rap Song
|
|-
|rowspan="2"|2011
|"Not Afraid" (Eminem)
|
|-
|Recovery (Eminem)
|Album of the Year
|
|-
|2015
|"0 to 100 / The Catch Up" (Drake)
|rowspan="2"|Best Rap Song
|
|-
|rowspan="2"|2016
|"Energy" (Drake)
|
|-
|To Pimp a Butterfly (Kendrick Lamar)
| rowspan="2"|Album of the Year
|
|-
|rowspan="2"|2017
|Views (Drake)
|
|-
|"Work" (Rihanna featuring Drake)
|rowspan="2"| Record of the Year
|
|-
|rowspan="6"|2019
|rowspan="3"|"God's Plan" (Drake)
|
|-
|Song of the Year
|
|-
|rowspan="3"|Best Rap Song
|
|-
|"Lucky You" (Eminem)
|
|-
|"Win" (Jay Rock)
|
|-
|Himself
|Producer of the Year, Non-Classical
|
|-
|2022
|Donda (Kanye West)
| rowspan="3"|Album of the Year
|
|-
|rowspan="4"|2023
|Mr. Morale & the Big Steppers (Kendrick Lamar)
|
|-
|Renaissance (Beyoncé)
|
|-
|"Churchill Downs" (Jack Harlow featuring Drake)
|Best Rap Song
|
|-
|Himself
|Producer of the Year, Non-Classical
|

References

External links
 
 Boi-1daon MySpace 
 
 
 HipHopCanada.com 2009 Interview (archived)
 Associated Press 2019 Interview
 Boi-1da page at Sony Music Canada

1986 births
Living people
Black Canadian musicians
Canadian hip hop record producers
Jamaican emigrants to Canada
Musicians from Kingston, Jamaica
Musicians from Toronto
OVO Sound artists
People from Ajax, Ontario
People from North York
People from Scarborough, Toronto
FL Studio users